The 1984–85 Serie A season was the 51st season of the Serie A, the top level of ice hockey in Italy. Ten teams participated in the league, and HC Bolzano won the championship by defeating HC Alleghe in the final.

First round

Second round

Group A

Group B

Playoffs

Relegation 
 HC Auronzo - HC Como 5:2/5:2

External links
 Season on hockeyarchives.info

Serie
Serie A (ice hockey) seasons
Italy